Algirdas is a Lithuanian male given name, derived from the Lithuanian terms al ("each, every") and gandas ("news, rumor") or girdintis ("hearing"). Variants of the name include Algis and Elgirdas. Algirdas may refer to:

Algirdas (1296–1377), Grand Duke of Lithuania
Algirdas Brazauskas (1932–2010), Lithuanian politician, President and Prime Minister
Algirdas Budrys (born 1939), Lithuanian musician
Algirdas Butkevičius (born 1958), Lithuanian politician and Prime Minister
Algirdas Endriukaitis (born 1936), Lithuanian politician 
Algirdas Julien Greimas (1917–1992), French literary scholar
Algirdas Kaušpėdas (born 1953), Lithuanian musician and architect
Algirdas Klimaitis (1923–1988), Lithuanian paramilitary commander
Algirdas Kumža (born 1956),  Lithuanian politician
Algirdas Lauritėnas (1932–2001), Lithuanian basketball player
Algirdas Linkevičius (born 1950), Lithuanian basketball player and coach
Algirdas Monkevičius (born 1956), Lithuanian politician
Algirdas Paleckis (born 1971), Lithuanian diplomat
Algirdas Vaclovas Patackas (1943–2015), Lithuanian politician and writer
Algirdas Petrulis (1915–2010), Lithuanian painter
Algirdas Petrusevičius (born 1937), Lithuanian politician
Algirdas Ražauskas (1952–2008), Lithuanian politician 
Algirdas Saudargas (born 1948), Lithuanian politician
Algirdas Šemeta (born 1962), Lithuanian politician
Algirdas Šocikas (1928–2012), Lithuanian boxer
Algirdas Sysas (born 1954), Lithuanian politician
Algirdas Tatulis (born 19??), Lithuanian paralympic athlete

References

Lithuanian masculine given names